Coleotechnites lewisi is a moth of the family Gelechiidae. It is found in North America, where it has been recorded from California and Alberta.

The larvae feed on Pinus flexilis.

References

Moths described in 1961
Coleotechnites